George Bush most commonly refers to:
 George H. W. Bush (1924–2018), 41st president of the United States and father of the 43rd president
 George W. Bush (born 1946), 43rd president of the United States and son of the 41st president

George Bush may also refer to:
 George Bush (biblical scholar) (1796–1859), American pastor, abolitionist, academic, and Zionist
 George Bush (footballer) (1883–1936), English footballer who played as a winger
 George Bush (racing driver) (1911–1967), American NASCAR driver
 George H. Bush (1857–1898), New York state legislator
 George P. Bush (born 1976), American attorney and politician; grandson of the 41st U.S. president and nephew of the 43rd
 George Bush (pioneer) (1779–1863), first African-American settler in what is now Washington State
 USS George H.W. Bush, an aircraft carrier named after the former president
 George H.W. Bush (film), a 2008 two-part biographical television film
 George W. Bush (film), a 2020 biographical film

See also
 
 
 
 Bush family
 Presidency of George Bush (disambiguation)
 George Brush (disambiguation)
 Bush (disambiguation)